New Haven Commercial Historic District is a national historic district located at New Haven, Franklin County, Missouri. The district encompasses nine contributing buildings in the central business district of New Haven. The district developed between about 1890 and 1940, and includes representative examples of Italianate and Art Deco style architecture.  Notable buildings include the John P. Altheide Store (c. 1890), Oscar Hoemeyer Hardware Store (1895), New Haven post Office / Farmer's Savings Bank (c. 1897), Frederick W. Pehle Building / Krull's Department Store (1905), Otto Bucholtz Store (c. 1930), and Walt Theater (1940).

It was listed on the National Register of Historic Places in 1999.

References

Historic districts on the National Register of Historic Places in Missouri
Italianate architecture in Missouri
Art Deco architecture in Missouri
Buildings and structures in Franklin County, Missouri
National Register of Historic Places in Franklin County, Missouri